Umberto Zanolini (March 31, 1887 – February 12, 1973) was an Italian gymnast who competed in the 1912 Summer Olympics. He was part of the Italian team, which was able to win the gold medal in the gymnastics men's team, European system event in 1912.

References

External links
profile

1887 births
1973 deaths
Italian male artistic gymnasts
Gymnasts at the 1912 Summer Olympics
Olympic gymnasts of Italy
Olympic gold medalists for Italy
Olympic medalists in gymnastics
Medalists at the 1912 Summer Olympics